Caven or Cavens may refer to:

People
Albert Cavens (1906–1985), Belgian-American silent film actor
Ingrid Caven (born 1938), German film actress
Jamie Caven (born 1976), English darts player 
John Caven (Canadian politician) (born 1838), Canadian politician
Jurgen Cavens (born 1978), Belgian footballer
Peter Caven (born 1970), Australian footballer
Simone Cavens, American silent film actress

In botany
Acacia caven
Acacia caven var. caven
Acacia caven var. stenocarpa
Acacia caven var. microcarpa
Acacia caven var. dehiscens